The Motorola Droid Pro, also offered by Sprint and Boost Mobile as the Motorola XPRT, and outside the United States simply as the Motorola PRO, is an Android-based smartphone manufactured by Motorola and released on November 18, 2010, for Verizon Wireless and June 5, 2011, for Sprint. These devices are available for Verizon, Sprint and Boost Mobile in the United States, and are designed for business users.

Features
The Droid Pro/XPRT/PRO features a 3.1" capacitive touchscreen paired with a QWERTY keyboard, and a 5-megapixel autofocus camera with dual LED flash. The smartphone includes global abilities, with customers able to use services in over 220 countries worldwide, 120 of which offer 3G connectivity. The Pro also includes 3G mobile hotspot abilities, and thus can share its connection, with up to five other devices.

See also
 HTC Droid Incredible released on April 29, 2010.
 Motorola Droid released November 6, 2009.
 Motorola Droid X Android 2.3 version hardware released in Mexico.
 Motorola Droid 2 released August 12, 2010.
 Motorola Droid X2 released May 19, 2011.
 Motorola Droid 3 released July 7, shipping with Android 2.3.4 (Gingerbread).
 Motorola Pro+ (MB632) slightly improved version of the DROID PRO with higher resolution screen, Qualcomm MSM8255 CPU, and Android 2.3.
 List of Android devices

References

External links
 Motorola DROID PRO info
 Motorola XPRT info

Android (operating system) devices
Motorola mobile phones
Smartphones
Sprint Corporation
Verizon Wireless
Mobile phones introduced in 2010
Discontinued smartphones